Natalie Anderson and Nadiya Anderson (born April 11, 1986) are American television personalities and twins, most commonly known as "The Twinnies". They appeared on The Amazing Race and Survivor: San Juan del Sur. Nadiya was the first contestant to be voted out, while Natalie was crowned Sole Survivor, winning the show's $1 million prize. Natalie also competed on Survivor: Winners at War, an all winners season. After being voted out first, she battled her way back into the game from the Edge of Extinction and finished runner-up on the season.

Early life
The Anderson twins were born in New York City to a Tamil father and a Sinhalese mother, but they moved to Sri Lanka when they were three and were there during the Sri Lankan Civil War. They moved to West Hartford, Connecticut when they were thirteen years old, attending Hall High School, where both sisters ran track and Natalie was captain of the swim team, and Fordham University's Gabelli School of Business, where Natalie played rugby. Before participating in their first season on The Amazing Race, both had moved to Edgewater, New Jersey. Natalie was studying physical therapy while Nadiya was a project coordinator for Bridge2Peace, which is an American educational charity operating in Sri Lanka.

Television appearances

The Amazing Race
Natalie and Nadiya first participated in the 21st season of The Amazing Race, where they called each other "Twinnie". The Andersons won two legs during the season but were eliminated in 4th place in the penultimate leg. They returned in the 24th season All-Stars competition, but were eliminated in the first leg of the season.

Survivor

San Juan del Sur
Natalie and Nadiya appeared as contestants on Survivor: San Juan del Sur. The twins appeared on a season that used the Blood vs. Water theme, which pitted nine pairs of loved ones against each other. Natalie was placed on the Hunahpu tribe, while Nadiya was on the Coyopa tribe, as the season's theme was pairs of loved ones competing against each other on opposing tribes. Nadiya was the first contestant eliminated from the competition. Natalie remained in the game, making it into the merged Huyopa tribe, and won three reward challenges, one individual immunity, and was sent to Exile Island twice. Natalie ultimately made it into the Final Three and was voted by the jury in a 5–2–1 vote as the Sole Survivor, winning the season's $1,000,000 grand prize.

Natalie was slated to return for Survivor: Game Changers as a member of the Nuku tribe, but she suffered a concussion and was replaced by Sierra Dawn Thomas.

Winners at War
For winning Survivor: San Juan del Sur, Natalie returned to compete on Survivor: Winners at War. She was the first person voted out, but inhabited the "Edge of Extinction" island. She spent 33 days on the Edge of Extinction, where she accumulated 16 Fire Tokens, the most any player in the game received. On day 35, Anderson used her 16 tokens to purchase three advantages in the re-entry competition, which helped her win and re-enter the main game. On day 36, she played an idol (purchased on Extinction Island) on herself, which voided 4 votes against her. On day 37, she found an idol and played it on herself, but received no votes. She won the Final Immunity Challenge on day 38, making it to the Final Tribal Council once again. However her gameplay was seen as safe compared to Tony's dominant gameplay, and she finished as the runner up to him in a 12-4-0 vote. Nadiya came to visit her on the loved ones' visit during episode ten.

The Challenge

Double Agents
Natalie competed on the thirty-sixth season of The Challenge. She was initially paired with Wes Bergmann and was voted into elimination in episode one, where she defeated opponent Ashley Mitchell. She was deemed medically unable to continue in the competition, withdrawing in episode 5, after learning that she was pregnant.

Additional television appearances

In 2016, Natalie appeared in a special episode of The Price Is Right which featured multiple former Survivor contestants competing on the show. The episode aired on May 23, 2016.

Filmography

Television

References

1986 births
The Amazing Race (American TV series) contestants
American people of Sri Lankan descent
American people of Sri Lankan Tamil descent
Identical twin females
Winners in the Survivor franchise
Living people
People from Edgewater, New Jersey
Television personalities from New York City
Survivor (American TV series) winners
American twins
The Challenge (TV series) contestants
Sibling duos
Hall High School (Connecticut) alumni
Gabelli School of Business alumni